Tunul de lemn is a 1986 Soviet drama film directed by Vasile Brescanu.

External links

Soviet drama films
Soviet-era Moldovan films
1986 films
1980s Romanian-language films
Moldovan drama films
1986 drama films